Shay Kutten is an Israeli computer scientist who holds the William M. Davidson Chair in Industrial Engineering and Management at the  Technion – Israel Institute of Technology in Haifa, Israel. He is with the Information Systems Group of the William Davidson Faculty of Industrial Engineering and Management.  His research involves Network Algorithms,  distributed computing, and Network Security.

Education and career
Kutten completed his BA, MSc, and DSc at the Technion – Israel Institute of Technology.  His MSc was performed under the supervision of Imrich Chlamtac, and the doctorate under the supervision of Shlomo Moran and Ephraim Korach. After a post doctorate with IBM T.J. Watson Research Center, he stayed there as a research staff member and as the group leader and manager of the network algorithms group and of the network security group he founded. There, he contributed to various IBM products and received several awards. In 1996 he joined the Faculty of Industrial Engineering and Management at the Technion. Kutten served as the program committee chair of EATCS DISC 1998, ACM PODC 2014, and SIROCCO 2010.

References

External links
Home page
Google scholar profile
DBLP

Israeli computer scientists
Academic staff of Technion – Israel Institute of Technology
Living people
Researchers in distributed computing
Year of birth missing (living people)